The Berkeley Arms is a public house at Purton, Gloucestershire GL13 9HU.

It is on the Campaign for Real Ale's National Inventory of Historic Pub Interiors.

References

National Inventory Pubs
Pubs in Gloucestershire